In mathematics, and in particular linear algebra, the Moore–Penrose inverse  of a matrix  is the most widely known generalization of the inverse matrix. It was independently described by E. H. Moore in 1920, Arne Bjerhammar in 1951, and Roger Penrose in 1955. Earlier, Erik Ivar Fredholm had introduced the concept of a pseudoinverse of integral operators in 1903. When referring to a matrix, the term pseudoinverse, without further specification, is often used to indicate the Moore–Penrose inverse. The term generalized inverse is sometimes used as a synonym for pseudoinverse.

A common use of the pseudoinverse is to compute a "best fit" (least squares) solution to a system of linear equations that lacks a solution (see below under § Applications).
Another use is to find the minimum (Euclidean) norm solution to a system of linear equations with multiple solutions. The pseudoinverse facilitates the statement and proof of results in linear algebra.

The pseudoinverse is defined and unique for all matrices whose entries are real or complex numbers. It can be computed using the singular value decomposition.

Notation
In the following discussion, the following conventions are adopted.

 For ,  and  denote the transpose and Hermitian transpose (also called conjugate transpose) respectively. If , then .
 Finally, for any positive integer ,  denotes the  identity matrix.

Definition
  acts like a weak inverse: 
  is Hermitian: 
  is also Hermitian: 

In particular, when  has linearly independent columns (and thus matrix  is invertible),  can be computed as

This particular pseudoinverse constitutes a left inverse, since, in this case, .

When  has linearly independent rows (matrix  is invertible),  can be computed as

Properties

Existence and uniqueness
The pseudoinverse exists and is unique: for any matrix , there is precisely one matrix , that satisfies the four properties of the definition.

A matrix satisfying the first condition of the definition is known as a generalized inverse. If the matrix also satisfies the second definition, it is called a generalized reflexive inverse. Generalized inverses always exist but are not in general unique. Uniqueness is a consequence of the last two conditions.

Basic properties
Proofs for the properties below can be found at b:Topics in Abstract Algebra/Linear algebra.
 If  has real entries, then so does .
 If  is invertible, its pseudoinverse is its inverse. That is, .
 For any  and any   where  (We use  for "reciprocal".)
 More generally, for any  and any  the rectangular diagonal matrix  where 
 It follows that the pseudoinverse of a zero matrix is its transpose.
 The pseudoinverse of the pseudoinverse is the original matrix: .
 Pseudoinversion commutes with transposition, complex conjugation, and taking the conjugate transpose:  

Identities
The following identity formula can be used to cancel or expand certain subexpressions involving pseudoinverses:

Equivalently, substituting  for  gives

while substituting  for  gives

Reduction to Hermitian case
The computation of the pseudoinverse is reducible to its construction in the Hermitian case. This is possible through the equivalences:

Products
Suppose . Then the following are equivalent:

 
 
 
 
 

The following are sufficient conditions for  :
  has orthonormal columns (then ),   or
  has orthonormal rows (then ),   or
  has linearly independent columns (then  ) and  has linearly independent rows (then ),   or
 , or
 .

The following is a necessary condition for :
 

The last sufficient condition yields the equalities

NB: The equality  does not hold in general.
See the counterexample:

Projectors
The following hold:
  and 

The last two properties imply the following identities:
 
 

Another property is the following: if  is Hermitian and idempotent (true if and only if it represents an orthogonal projection), then, for any matrix  the following equation holds:

From the last property it follows that, if  is Hermitian and idempotent, for any matrix 

Finally, if  is an orthogonal projection matrix, then its pseudoinverse trivially coincides with the matrix itself, that is, .

Geometric construction
If we view the matrix as a linear map  over the field  then  can be decomposed as follows. The restriction  is then an isomorphism.

The element of this subspace that has the smallest length (that is, is closest to the origin) is the answer  we are looking for.

This description is closely related to the minimum-norm solution to a linear system.

Subspaces

Limit relations
The pseudoinverse are limits:

(see Tikhonov regularization). These limits exist even if  or  do not exist.

Continuity

Derivative
The derivative of a real valued pseudoinverse matrix which has constant rank at a point  may be calculated in terms of the derivative of the original matrix:

Examples
Since for invertible matrices the pseudoinverse equals the usual inverse, only examples of non-invertible matrices are considered below.

Special cases

Scalars
It is also possible to define a pseudoinverse for scalars and vectors. This amounts to treating these as matrices. The pseudoinverse of a scalar  is zero if  is zero and the reciprocal of  otherwise:

Vectors
The pseudoinverse of the null (all zero) vector is the transposed null vector. The pseudoinverse of a non-null vector is the conjugate transposed vector divided by its squared magnitude:

Linearly independent columns
In this case, an explicit formula is:

It follows that  is then a left inverse of :   .

Linearly independent rows
In this case, an explicit formula is:

It follows that  is a right inverse of :   .

Orthonormal columns or rows
This is a special case of either full column rank or full row rank (treated above). If  has orthonormal columns or orthonormal rows, then:

Normal matrices 
If  is normal; that is, it commutes with its conjugate transpose, then its pseudoinverse can be computed by diagonalizing it, mapping all nonzero eigenvalues to their inverses, and mapping zero eigenvalues to zero. A corollary is that  commuting with its transpose implies that it commutes with its pseudoinverse.

Orthogonal projection matrices
This is a special case of a normal matrix with eigenvalues 0 and 1.

Circulant matrices
For a circulant matrix , the singular value decomposition is given by the Fourier transform, that is, the singular values are the Fourier coefficients. Let  be the Discrete Fourier Transform (DFT) matrix; then

Construction

Rank decomposition
Then  can be (rank) decomposed as
Then .

The QR method
An alternative approach using the QR decomposition of  may be used instead.

Consider the case when  is of full column rank, so that . Then the Cholesky decomposition , where  is an upper triangular matrix, may be used. Multiplication by the inverse is then done easily by solving a system with multiple right-hand sides,

which may be solved by forward substitution followed by back substitution.

Then

Singular value decomposition (SVD)
A computationally simple and accurate way to compute the pseudoinverse is by using the singular value decomposition. In numerical computation, only elements larger than some small tolerance are taken to be nonzero, and the others are replaced by zeros. For example, in the MATLAB or GNU Octave function , the tolerance is taken to be , where ε is the machine epsilon.

The computational cost of this method is dominated by the cost of computing the SVD, which is several times higher than matrix–matrix multiplication, even if a state-of-the art implementation (such as that of LAPACK) is used.

Block matrices
Optimized approaches exist for calculating the pseudoinverse of block structured matrices.

The iterative method of Ben-Israel and Cohen
Another method for computing the pseudoinverse (cf. Drazin inverse) uses the recursion

which is sometimes referred to as hyper-power sequence. This recursion produces a sequence converging quadratically to the pseudoinverse of  if it is started with an appropriate  satisfying . The choice  (where , with  denoting the largest singular value of ) has been argued not to be competitive to the method using the SVD mentioned above, because even for moderately ill-conditioned matrices it takes a long time before  enters the region of quadratic convergence.

Updating the pseudoinverse
In particular, if the related matrix differs from the original one by only a changed, added or deleted row or column, incremental algorithms exist that exploit the relationship.

Similarly, it is possible to update the Cholesky factor when a row or column is added, without creating the inverse of the correlation matrix explicitly. However, updating the pseudoinverse in the general rank-deficient case is much more complicated.

Software libraries
High-quality implementations of SVD, QR, and back substitution are available in standard libraries, such as LAPACK.  Writing one's own implementation of SVD is a major programming project that requires a significant numerical expertise. In special circumstances, such as parallel computing or embedded computing, however, alternative implementations by QR or even the use of an explicit inverse might be preferable, and custom implementations may be unavoidable.

The Python package NumPy provides a pseudoinverse calculation through its functions matrix.I and linalg.pinv; its pinv uses the SVD-based algorithm. SciPy adds a function scipy.linalg.pinv that uses a least-squares solver. 

The MASS package for R provides a calculation of the Moore–Penrose inverse through the ginv function. The ginv function calculates a pseudoinverse using the singular value decomposition provided by the svd function in the base R package. An alternative is to employ the pinv function available in the pracma package.

The Octave programming language provides a pseudoinverse through the standard package function pinv and the pseudo_inverse() method.

In Julia (programming language), the LinearAlgebra package of the standard library provides an implementation of the Moore–Penrose inverse pinv() implemented via singular-value decomposition.

Applications

Linear least-squares

The pseudoinverse provides a least squares solution to a system of linear equations.
For , given a system of linear equations

in general, a vector  that solves the system may not exist, or if one does exist, it may not be unique. The pseudoinverse solves the "least-squares" problem as follows:

 , we have  where  and  denotes the Euclidean norm.  This weak inequality holds with equality if and only if   for any vector ; this provides an infinitude of minimizing solutions unless  has full column rank, in which case   is a zero matrix. The solution with minimum Euclidean norm is 

This result is easily extended to systems with multiple right-hand sides, when the Euclidean norm is replaced by the Frobenius norm. Let .

 , we have  where  and  denotes the Frobenius norm.

Obtaining all solutions of a linear system
If the linear system

has any solutions, they are all given by

for arbitrary vector . Solution(s) exist if and only if .  If the latter holds, then the solution is unique if and only if  has full column rank, in which case  is a zero matrix. If solutions exist but  does not have full column rank, then we have an indeterminate system, all of whose infinitude of solutions are given by this last equation.

Minimum norm solution to a linear system
For linear systems  with non-unique solutions (such as under-determined systems), the pseudoinverse may be used to construct the solution of minimum Euclidean norm
 among all solutions.

 If  is satisfiable, the vector  is a solution, and satisfies  for all solutions.

This result is easily extended to systems with multiple right-hand sides, when the Euclidean norm is replaced by the Frobenius norm. Let .

 If  is satisfiable, the matrix  is a solution, and satisfies  for all solutions.

Condition number
Using the pseudoinverse and a matrix norm, one can define a condition number for any matrix:

A large condition number implies that the problem of finding least-squares solutions to the corresponding system of linear equations is ill-conditioned in the sense that small errors in the entries of  can lead to huge errors in the entries of the solution.

Generalizations
Besides for matrices over real and complex numbers, the conditions hold for matrices over biquaternions, also called "complex quaternions".

It turns out that not every continuous linear operator has a continuous linear pseudoinverse in this sense.

A notion of pseudoinverse exists for matrices over an arbitrary field equipped with an arbitrary involutive automorphism. In this more general setting, a given matrix doesn't always have a pseudoinverse. When it does exist, it is unique. Example: Consider the field of complex numbers equipped with the identity involution (as opposed to the involution considered elsewhere in the article); do there exist matrices that fail to have pseudoinverses in this sense? Consider the matrix . Observe that  while . So this matrix doesn't have a pseudoinverse in this sense.

In abstract algebra, a Moore–Penrose inverse may be defined on a *-regular semigroup. This abstract definition coincides with the one in linear algebra.

See also
 Drazin inverse
 Hat matrix
 Inverse element
 Linear least squares (mathematics)
 Pseudo-determinant
 Von Neumann regular ring

Notes

References

External links
 
 Interactive program & tutorial of Moore–Penrose Pseudoinverse
 
 
 
 The Moore–Penrose Pseudoinverse. A Tutorial Review of the Theory
 Online Moore–Penrose Inverse calculator

Matrix theory
Singular value decomposition
Numerical linear algebra